A nuclear power phase-out is the discontinuation of usage of nuclear power for energy production. Often initiated because of concerns about nuclear power, phase-outs usually include shutting down nuclear power plants and looking towards fossil fuels and renewable energy. Three nuclear accidents have influenced the discontinuation of nuclear power: the 1979 Three Mile Island partial nuclear meltdown in the United States, the 1986 Chernobyl disaster in the USSR (now Ukraine), and the 2011 Fukushima nuclear disaster in Japan.

Following Fukushima, Germany has permanently shut down eight of its 17 reactors and pledged to close the rest by the end of 2022. In late 2021 all but three of the remaining German nuclear power plants were shut down. However, there are no plans to shut down the research reactor in Garching, Forschungsreaktor München II. Italy voted overwhelmingly to keep their country non-nuclear. Switzerland and Spain have banned the construction of new reactors. Japan's prime minister called for a dramatic reduction in Japan's reliance on nuclear power. Taiwan's president did the same. Shinzō Abe, the prime minister of Japan from 2012 to 2020, announced a plan to re-start some of the 54 Japanese nuclear power plants (NPPs) and to continue some NPP sites under construction.

The impacts of the nuclear shut-downs on the power generation mix, post-Fukushima, have significantly set back emissions reductions goals in these countries. A recent study of the impacts of the German and Japan phaseouts concludes that by continuing to operate their nuclear plants "these two countries could have prevented 28,000 air pollution-induced deaths and 2400 MtCO2 emissions between 2011 and 2017.""By sharply reducing nuclear instead of coal and gas after Fukushima both countries lost the chance to prevent very large amounts of air pollution-induced deaths and  emissions". As of 2021 Japan planned on restarting 30 reactors by 2030 as well as investing in future SMR development

, countries including Australia, Austria, Denmark, Ireland, Italy, Estonia, Latvia, Liechtenstein, Luxembourg, Malaysia, Malta, New Zealand, Norway, Portugal and Serbia have no nuclear power stations and remain opposed to nuclear power. Germany, Spain and Switzerland plan nuclear phase-outs by 2030.
However several countries formerly opposed to opening nuclear programs or planning phaseouts have reversed course in recent years due to climate concerns and energy independence including Belgium, the Philippines, Greece, Sweden and South Korea.
Globally, more nuclear power reactors have closed than opened in recent years but overall capacity has increased. As Generation II reactors reach the end of their service life, some countries replace them with Generation III reactors or what is deemed "Generation III+ reactors". While Generation IV reactors include small modular reactors, the majority of "evolutionary" designs like the EPR have a higher capacity than comparable reactors of earlier generations. Furthermore, countries like Canada, which decided to refurbish its existing CANDU reactors, among them Bruce Nuclear Generating Station, the most powerful single site nuclear power plant outside Asia, have increased capacity at existing reactors by optimising efficiency.

, Italy is the only country that has permanently closed all of its formerly functioning nuclear plants, with Germany phasing out the remaining 3 plants by the end of the year. Lithuania and Kazakhstan have shut down their only nuclear plants, but plan to build new ones to replace them, while Armenia shut down its only nuclear plant but subsequently restarted it. Austria never used its first nuclear plant that was completely built. Due to financial, political and technical reasons Cuba, Libya, North Korea and Poland never completed the construction of their first nuclear plants (although North Korea and Poland plan to).  Azerbaijan, Bangladesh, Georgia, Ghana, Ireland, Kuwait, Oman, Peru, Venezuela have planned, but not constructed their first nuclear plants. Between 2005 and 2021 the global production of nuclear power increased by 1.1%.

Overview 

A popular movement against nuclear power exists in the Western world, based on concerns about more nuclear accidents and concerns about nuclear waste. Anti-nuclear critics see nuclear power as a dangerous, expensive way to boil water to generate electricity. The 1979 Three Mile Island accident and the 1986 Chernobyl disaster played a key role in stopping new plant construction in many countries. Major anti-nuclear power groups include Friends of the Earth, Greenpeace, Institute for Energy and Environmental Research, Nuclear Information and Resource Service, and Sortir du nucléaire (France).

Several countries, especially European countries, have abandoned the construction of new of nuclear power plants. Austria (1978), Sweden (1980) and Italy (1987) voted in referendums to oppose or phase out nuclear power, while opposition in Ireland prevented a nuclear program there. Countries that have no nuclear plants and have restricted new plant constructions comprise Australia, Austria, Denmark, Greece, Italy, Ireland, Norway and Serbia. Poland stopped the construction of a plant. Belgium, Germany, Spain, and Sweden decided not to build new plants or intend to phase out nuclear power, although still mostly relying on nuclear energy.

New reactors under construction in Finland and France, which were meant to lead a nuclear new build, have been substantially delayed and are running over-budget. Despite these delays the Olkiluoto reactor is now online and delivering low-emissions power to the grid as of 12 March 2022. "When Olkiluoto 3 reaches full output, around 90% of Finland's electricity generation will come from clean, low-carbon electricity sources, with nuclear generation supplying around half of that." In addition, China has 11 units under construction and there are also new reactors being built in Bangladesh, Belarus, Brazil, India, Japan, Pakistan, Russia, Slovakia, South Korea, Turkey, United Arab Emirates, United Kingdom and the United States of America. At least 100 older and smaller reactors will "most probably be closed over the next 10–15 years".

Countries that wish to shut down nuclear power plants must find alternatives for electricity generation; otherwise, they are forced to become dependent on imports. Therefore, the discussion of a future for nuclear energy is intertwined with discussions about fossil fuels or an energy transition to renewable energy.

Countries that have decided on a phase-out

Austria

A nuclear power station was built during the 1970s at Zwentendorf, Austria, but its start-up was prevented by a referendum in 1978. On 9 July 1997, the Austrian Parliament voted unanimously to maintain the country's anti-nuclear policy. The built but never used reactor was converted into a museum and has also been used as a movie set and to train people involved in various aspects of nuclear power and safety. It is uniquely suitable for this purpose as it includes every aspect of an actual nuclear power plant except the radiation.

Belgium 
Belgium's nuclear phase-out legislation was agreed in July 1999 by the Liberals (VLD and MR), the Socialists (SP.A and PS) and the Greens party (Groen! and Ecolo). The phase-out law calls for each of Belgium's seven reactors to close after 40 years of operation with no new reactors built subsequently. When the law was being passed, it was speculated it would be overturned again as soon as an administration without the Greens was in power.

In the federal election in May 2003, there was an electoral threshold of 5% for the first time. Therefore, the Green parties 
the ECOLO got only 3.06% of the votes, so ECOLO obtained no seat in the Chamber of Representatives. In July 2003, Guy Verhofstadt formed his second government.  It was a continuation of the Verhofstadt I Government but without the Green parties.
In September 2005, the government decided to partially overturn the previous decision, extending the phase-out period for another 20 years, with possible further extensions.

In July 2005, the Federal Planning Bureau published a new report, which stated that oil and other fossil fuels generate 90% of Belgian energy use, while nuclear power accounts for 9% and renewable energy for 1%. Electricity only amounts to 16% of total energy use, and while nuclear-powered electricity amounts to 9% of use in Belgium, in many parts of Belgium, especially in Flanders, it makes up more than 50% of the electricity provided to households and businesses. This was one of the major reasons to revert the earlier phase-out, since it was impossible to provide more than 50% of the electricity by 'alternative' energy-production, and a revert to the classical coal-driven electricity would mean inability to adhere to the Kyoto Protocol.

In August 2005, French SUEZ offered to buy the Belgian Electrabel, which runs nuclear power stations. At the end of 2005, Suez had some 98.5% of all Electrabel shares. Beginning 2006, Suez and Gaz de France announced a merger.

After the federal election in June 2007, a political crisis began and lasted until the end of 2011.

In the 2010–2011 Belgian government formation negotiations, the phase-out was emphasised again, with concrete plans to shut off three of the country's seven reactors by 2015.

Before the Fukushima nuclear disaster, the plan of the government was for all nuclear power stations to shut down by 2025. Although intermediate deadlines have been missed or pushed back, on 30 March 2018 the Belgian Council of Ministers confirmed the 2025 phase-out date and stated draft legislation would be brought forward later in the year.

In March 2022, the government decided to allow Doel 4 and Tihange 3 to continue operating until 2035 to allow the country to "strengthen its independence of fossil fuels in turbulent geopolitical times". Belgium's two newest nuclear plants are operated by French utility Engie and account for almost half of the country's electricity production. "This extension should allow to strengthen our country's independence from fossil fuels in a chaotic geopolitical context", the government said.

Belgium continues to be active in nuclear research and is building MYRRHA, the world's first large scale demonstration of an accelerator-driven subcritical reactor that is to be used for nuclear transmutation of high level waste.

Germany 

In 2000, the First Schröder cabinet, consisting of the SPD and Alliance '90/The Greens, officially announced its intention to phase out the use of nuclear energy. The power plants in Stade and in Obrigheim were turned off on 14 November 2003, and 11 May 2005, respectively. The plants' dismantling was scheduled to begin in 2007.

The year 2000 Renewable Energy Sources Act provided for a feed-in tariff in support of renewable energy. The German government, declaring climate protection as a key policy issue, announced a carbon dioxide reduction target by the year 2005 compared to 1990 by 25%. In 1998, the use of renewables in Germany reached 284 PJ of primary energy demand, which corresponded to 5% of the total electricity demand. By 2010, the German government wanted to reach 10%.; in fact, 17% were reached (2011: 20%, 2015: 30%).

Anti-nuclear activists have argued the German government had been supportive of nuclear power by providing financial guarantees for energy providers. Also it has been pointed out, there were, as yet, no plans for the final storage of nuclear waste. By tightening safety regulations and increasing taxation, a faster end to nuclear power could have been forced. A gradual closing down of nuclear power plants had come along with concessions in questions of safety for the population with transport of nuclear waste throughout Germany. This latter point has been disagreed with by the Minister of Environment, Nature Conservation and Nuclear Safety.

In 2005, critics of a phase-out in Germany argued that the power output from the nuclear power stations will not be adequately compensated and predict an energy crisis. They also predicted that only coal-powered plants could compensate for nuclear power and CO2 emissions would increase tremendously (with the use of oil and fossils). Energy would have to be imported from France's nuclear power facilities or Russian natural gas. 
Numerous factors, including progress in wind turbine technology and photovoltaics, reduced the need for conventional alternatives.

In 2011, Deutsche Bank analysts concluded that "the global impact of the Fukushima accident is a fundamental shift in public perception with regard to how a nation prioritizes and values its population's health, safety, security, and natural environment when determining its current and future energy pathways". There were many anti-nuclear protests and, on 29 May 2011, Merkel's government announced that it would close all of its nuclear power plants by December 2022. Following the March 2011 Fukushima nuclear disaster, Germany has permanently shut down eight of its 17 reactors.
Galvanised by the Fukushima nuclear disaster, first anniversary anti-nuclear demonstrations were held in Germany in March 2012. Organisers say more than 50,000 people in six regions took part.

The German Energiewende designates a significant change in energy policy from 2010.  The term encompasses a transition by Germany to a low carbon, environmentally sound, reliable, and affordable energy supply.
On 6 June 2011, following Fukushima, the government removed the use of nuclear power as a bridging technology as part of their policy.

In September 2011, German engineering giant Siemens announced it will withdraw entirely from the nuclear industry, as a response to the Fukushima nuclear disaster in Japan, and said that it would no longer build nuclear power plants anywhere in the world. The company's chairman, Peter Löscher, said that "Siemens was ending plans to cooperate with Rosatom, the Russian state-controlled nuclear power company, in the construction of dozens of nuclear plants throughout Russia over the coming two decades". Also in September 2011, IAEA Director General Yukiya Amano said the Japanese nuclear disaster "caused deep public anxiety throughout the world and damaged confidence in nuclear power".

A 2016 study shows that during the nuclear phaseout, the security of electricity supply in Germany stayed at the same high level compared to other European countries and even improved in 2014.  The study was conducted near the halfway point of the phaseout, 9plants having been shut and a further 8 still in operation.

In early-October 2016, Swedish electric power company Vattenfall began litigation against the German government for its 2011 decision to accelerate the phase-out of nuclear power.  Hearing are taking place at the World Bank's International Centre for Settlement of Investment Disputes (ICSID) in Washington DC and Vattenfall is claiming almost €4.7billion in damages.  The German government has called the action "inadmissible and unfounded". These proceedings were ongoing in December 2016, despite Vattenfall commencing civil litigation within Germany.

On 5December 2016, the Federal Constitutional Court ruled that the nuclear plant operators affected by the accelerated phase-out of nuclear power following the Fukushima disaster are eligible for "adequate" compensation.  The court found that the nuclear exit was essentially constitutional but that the utilities are entitled to damages for the "good faith" investments they made in 2010.  The utilities can now sue the German government under civil law.  E.ON, RWE, and Vattenfall are expected to seek a total of €19billion under separate suits. Six cases were registered with courts in Germany, .

A scientific paper released in 2019 found that the German nuclear shutdown led to an increase in carbon dioxide emissions around 36.2 megatons per year, and killed 1100 people a year through increased air pollution. As they shut down nuclear power, Germany made heavy investments in renewable energy, but those same investments could have "cut much deeper into fossil fuel energy" if the nuclear generation had still been online.

Aligning with the end of the 2021 COP26 climate talks, the operators of Germany's six remaining nuclear power stations, utilities E.ON, RWE, and EnBW, rejected calls to keep the plants in operation beyond their scheduled shutdowns at the end of 2022. However, in reaction to the 2022 Russian invasion of Ukraine the debate about whether to extend the life of the three remaining reactors or whether to restart operation in the three reactors shut down at the end of 2021 (whose dismantling hasn't started yet) once more came to the forefront and operators said that it would be possible to extend the life of those reactors under certain conditions.

In July 2022, faced with a looming energy crisis, the German parliament voted to reactivate closed coal power plants.

Of the 17 nuclear power plants Germany had at its peak, three remain in operation as of 2022: Isar 2, Emsland and Neckarwestheim 2, which are operated by German energy firms E.ON (EONGn.DE), RWE (RWEG.DE) and EnBW (EBKG.DE), respectively. Current legislation means that the remaining operators will lose the right to operate their plants beyond 31 December 2022, the effective end-date for the stations. Germany's network regulator (part of the Economy Ministry), could decide that they are critical to the security of power supply (both electricity and nuclear transmutation) and allow them to run for longer.

Italy 
Nuclear power phase-out commenced in Italy in 1987, one year after the Chernobyl accident. Following a referendum in that year, Italy's four nuclear power plants were closed down, the last in 1990. A moratorium on the construction of new plants, originally in effect from 1987 until 1993, has since been extended indefinitely.

In recent years, Italy has been an importer of nuclear-generated electricity, and its largest electricity utility Enel S.p.A. has been investing in reactors in both France and Slovakia to provide this electricity in the future, and also in the development of the EPR technology.

In October 2005, there was a seminar sponsored by the government about the possibility of reviving Italian nuclear power. The fourth cabinet led by Silvio Berlusconi tried to implement a new nuclear plan but a referendum held in June 2011 stopped any project.

Philippines 

In the Philippines, in 2004, President Gloria Macapagal Arroyo outlined her energy policy. She wants to increase indigenous oil and gas reserves through exploration, develop alternative energy resources, enforce the development of natural gas as a fuel and coco diesel as alternative fuel, and build partnerships with Saudi Arabia, Asian countries, China and Russia. She also made public plans to convert the (never completed) Bataan Nuclear Power Plant into a gas-powered facility.

Switzerland 

, the five operational Swiss nuclear reactors were Beznau 1 and 2, Gösgen, Leibstadt, and Mühleberg—all located in the German speaking part of the country. Nuclear power accounted for 36.4% of the national electricity generation, while 57.9% came from hydroelectricity. The remaining 5.7% was generated by other conventional and non-hydro renewable power stations.

On 25 May 2011, the Federal Council decided on a slow phase-out by not extending running times or building new power plants. The first power plant, Mühleberg, was shut down on 20 December 2019, the last will stop running in 2034.

In 2018, the International Energy Agency has warned that Switzerland's phased withdrawal from nuclear power presents challenges for maintaining its electricity security. They caution that Switzerland will be increasingly relying on imports from its European neighbours to meet electricity demand, especially during the winter months when low water levels impact production from hydro plants.

There have been many Swiss referendums on the topic of nuclear energy, beginning in 1979 with a citizens' initiative for nuclear safety, which was rejected. In 1984, there was a vote on an initiative "for a future without further nuclear power stations" with the result being a 55 to 45% vote against. On 23 September 1990, Switzerland had two more referendums about nuclear power. The initiative "stop the construction of nuclear power stations", which proposed a ten-year moratorium on the construction of new nuclear power plants, was passed with 54.5% to 45.5%. The initiative for a phase-out was rejected with by 53% to 47.1%. In 2000, there was a vote on a green tax for support of solar energy. It was rejected by 67–31%. On 18 May 2003, there were two referendums: "Electricity without Nuclear", asking for a decision on a nuclear power phase-out, and "Moratorium Plus", for an extension of the earlier-decided moratorium on the construction of new nuclear power plants. Both were turned down. The results were: Moratorium Plus: 41.6% Yes, 58.4% No; Electricity without Nuclear: 33.7% Yes, 66.3% No.

The program of the "Electricity without Nuclear" petition was to shut down all nuclear power stations by 2033, starting with Unit 1 and 2 of Beznau nuclear power stations, Mühleberg in 2005, Gösgen in 2009, and Leibstadt in 2014. "Moratorium Plus" was for an extension of the moratorium for another ten years, and additionally a condition to stop the present reactors after 40 years of operation. To extend the 40 years by ten more years, another referendum would have to be held (at high administrative costs). The rejection of the Moratorium Plus had come as a surprise to many, as opinion polls before the referendum had showed acceptance. Reasons for the rejections in both cases were seen as the worsened economic situation.

Other significant places

Europe 

In Spain a moratorium was enacted by the socialist government in 1983 and in 2006 plans for a phase-out of seven reactors were being discussed anew.

In Ireland, a nuclear power plant was first proposed in 1968. It was to be built during the 1970s at Carnsore Point in County Wexford. The plan called for first one, then ultimately four plants to be built at the site, but it was dropped after strong opposition from environmental groups, and Ireland has remained without nuclear power since. Despite opposing nuclear power (and nuclear fuel reprocessing at Sellafield), Ireland is to open an interconnector to the mainland UK to buy electricity, which is, in some part, the product of nuclear power.

Slovenian nuclear plant in Krško (co-owned with Croatia) is scheduled to be closed by 2023, and there are no plans to build further nuclear plants. The debate on whether and when to close the Krško plant was somewhat intensified after the 2005/06 winter energy crisis. In May 2006 the Ljubljana-based daily Dnevnik claimed Slovenian government officials internally proposed adding a new 1000 MW block into Krško after the year 2020.

Greece operates only a single small nuclear reactor in the Greek National Physics Research Laboratory in Demokritus Laboratories for research purposes.

Serbia currently operates a single nuclear research reactor in the Vinča Institute. Previously, Vinča Institute had two active reactors: RA and RB. In the 1958, nuclear incident happened. Six workers received critical amount of radiation and one of them died. These workers received first bone marrow transplant in Europe. After, Chernobyl disaster, in 1989, moratorium on use of nuclear energy was in power. Later, the law officially prohibited use of nuclear energy. To this day, Directorate for Nuclear and Radiation Safety (Srbatom) is strongly opposed to any kind of nuclear energy use in Serbia or neighbouring countries.

The future expansion of nuclear power in the United Kingdom to make up 25% of electrical production was announced in March 2022. The country has a number of reactors which are currently reaching the end of their working life, and the future of nuclear in the UK was uncertain. The government has now said it could approve up to eight new reactors to help reach a target of generating 24GW of the total from nuclear power plants. The UK has succeeded in reaching its targets for reduction on CO2 emissions in 2020 in part thanks to nuclear power, its situation may be made worse if new nuclear power stations are not built. The UK also uses a large proportion of gas-fired power stations, which produce half the CO2 emissions as coal, but there have been recent difficulties in obtaining adequate gas supplies. In 2016 the UK government committed to support the new Hinkley Point C nuclear power station. As of 2021, the Hinkley Point C is under construction and 3% over budget largely due to the COVID-19 pandemic. The UK Government is also under talks with EDF Energy for a new nuclear power station at Sizewell C nuclear power station, it is also considering aid in a variety of options at Wylfa nuclear power station, Moorside nuclear power station and Bradwell B nuclear power station signifying a strong will to preserve a large portion of nuclear energy in its energy mix as an effort for further decarbonisation.

Sweden 

A year after the Three Mile Island accident in 1979 the 1980 Swedish nuclear power referendum was held. It led to the Swedish parliament deciding that no further nuclear power plants should be built, and that a nuclear power phase-out should be completed by 2010. On 5 February 2009, the Government of Sweden effectively ended the phase-out policy. In 2010, Parliament approved for new reactors to replace existing ones.

The nuclear reactors at the Barsebäck Nuclear Power Plant were shut down between 1999 and 2005. In October 2015, corporations running the nuclear plants decided to phase out two reactors at Oskarshamn and two at Ringhals, reducing the number of remaining reactors from 12 in 1999 to 6 in 2020.

An opinion poll in April 2016 showed that about half of Swedes want to phase out nuclear power, 30 per cent want its use continued, and 20 per cent are undecided. Prior to the Fukushima Daiichi nuclear disaster in 2011, "a clear majority of Swedes" had been in favour of nuclear power. In June 2016, the opposition parties and the government reached an agreement on Swedish nuclear power. The agreement is to phase out the output tax on nuclear power, and allow ten new replacement reactors to be built at current nuclear plants.

Since then, public support of nuclear energy has grown, with a majority of people in favour of nuclear power in 2019. Those in favour of decommissioning nuclear has dropped to a record low of 11 per cent.

The Netherlands 
In the Netherlands, in 1994, the Dutch parliament voted to phase out after a discussion of nuclear waste management. The power station at Dodewaard was shut down in 1997. In 1997 the government decided to end Borssele's operating licence, at the end of 2003. In 2003 the shut-down was postponed by the government to 2013. In 2005 the decision was reversed and research in expanding nuclear power has been initiated. Reversal was preceded by the publication of the Christian Democratic Appeal's report on sustainable energy. Other coalition parties then conceded. In 2006 the government decided that Borssele will remain open until 2033, if it can comply with the highest safety standards. The owners, Essent and DELTA will invest 500 million euro in sustainable energy, together with the government, money which the government claims otherwise should have been paid to the plants owners as compensation. In December 2021, the Fourth Rutte cabinet stated that it wants to prepare for the construction of two new nuclear power plants to reduce  emissions and meet the European Union goals for tackling climate change. Part of this preparation is the launch of a feasibility study, looking at the advantages and disadvantages of the use of nuclear power to tackle climate change.

Australia 

In Australia uranium is mined and exported for power generation though nuclear power plants are illegal domestically. Australia has very extensive, low-cost coal reserves and substantial natural gas and majority political opinion is still opposed to domestic nuclear power on both environmental and economic grounds.

Asia 
Renewable energy, mainly hydropower, is gaining share.

For North Korea, two PWRs at Kumho were under construction until that was suspended in November 2003. On 19 September 2005 North Korea pledged to stop building nuclear weapons and agreed to international inspections in return for energy aid, which may include one or more light water reactors – the agreement said "The other parties expressed their respect and agreed to discuss at an appropriate time the subject of the provision of light-water reactor" [sic].

In July 2000, the Turkish government decided not to build four reactors at the controversial Akkuyu Nuclear Power Plant, but later changed its mind. The official launch ceremony took place in April 2015, and the first unit is expected to be completed in 2020.

Taiwan has 3 active plants and 6 reactors. Active seismic faults run across the island, and some environmentalists argue Taiwan is unsuited for nuclear plants. Construction of the Lungmen Nuclear Power Plant using the ABWR design has encountered public opposition and a host of delays, and in April 2014 the government decided to halt construction. Construction will be halted from July 2015 to 2017 to allow time for a referendum to be held. The 2016 election was won by a government with stated policies that included phasing out nuclear power generation.

India has 20 reactors operating, 6 reactors under construction, and is planning an additional 24.

Vietnam had developed detailed plans for 2 nuclear power plants with 8 reactors, but in November 2016 decided to abandon nuclear power plans as they were "not economically viable because of other cheaper sources of power."

Japan

Once a nuclear proponent, Prime Minister Naoto Kan became increasingly anti-nuclear following the Fukushima nuclear disaster. In May 2011, he closed the ageing Hamaoka Nuclear Power Plant over earthquake and tsunami fears, and said he would freeze plans to build new reactors. In July 2011, Kan said that "Japan should reduce and eventually eliminate its dependence on nuclear energy ... saying that the Fukushima accident had demonstrated the dangers of the technology". In August 2011, the Japanese government passed a bill to subsidise electricity from renewable energy sources. A 2011 Japanese Cabinet energy white paper says "public confidence in safety of nuclear power was greatly damaged" by the Fukushima disaster, and calls for a reduction in the nation's reliance on nuclear power. , the crippled Fukushima nuclear plant is still leaking low levels of radioactivity and areas surrounding it could remain uninhabitable for decades.

By March 2012, one year after the disaster, all but two of Japan's nuclear reactors were shut down; some were damaged by the quake and tsunami. The following year, the last two were taken off-line. Authority to restart the others after scheduled maintenance throughout the year was given to local governments, and in all cases local opposition prevented restarting.

Prime Minister Shinzo Abe's government, reelected on a platform of restarting nuclear power, plans to have nuclear power account for 20 to 22 per cent of the country's total electricity supply by 2030, compared with roughly 30 per cent before the disaster at the Fukushima complex.

In 2015 two reactors at Sendai Nuclear Power Plant have been restarted. In 2016 Ikata-3 restarted and in 2017 Takahama-4 restarted. In 2021 Mihama Nuclear Power Plant unit 3 was restarted.

In 2023, Japan's Cabinet approved a policy to allow new nuclear power reactors to be constructed and operation of existing reactors to be extended from 40 to 60 years.

United States 

The United States is, as of 2013, undergoing a practical phase-out independent of stated goals and continued official support. This is not due to concerns about the source or anti-nuclear groups, but due to the rapidly falling prices of natural gas and the reluctance of investors to provide funding for long-term projects when short term profitability of turbine power is available.

Through the 2000s a number of factors led to greatly increased interest in new nuclear reactors, including rising demand, new lower-cost reactor designs, and concerns about global climate change. By 2009, about 30 new reactors were planned, and a large number of existing reactors had applied for upgrades to increase their output. In total, 39 reactors have had their licences renewed, three Early Site Permits have been applied for, and three consortiums have applied for Combined Construction-Operating Licences under the Nuclear Power 2010 Program. In addition, the Energy Policy Act of 2005 contains incentives to further expand nuclear power.

However, by 2012 the vast majority of these plans were cancelled, and several additional cancellations followed in 2013. Currently only three new reactors are under construction, and one, at Watts Bar, was originally planned in the 1970s and only under construction now. Construction of the new AP1000 design is underway at one location in the United States in Georgia . Plans for additional reactors in Florida were cancelled in 2013.

Some smaller reactors operating in deregulated markets have become uneconomic to operate and maintain, due to competition from generators using low priced natural gas, and may be retired early. The 556 MWe Kewaunee Power Station is being closed 20 years before licence expiry for these economic reasons. Duke Energy's Crystal River 3 Nuclear Power Plant in Florida closed, as it could not recover the costs needed to fix its containment building.

As a result of these changes, after reaching peak production in 2007, US nuclear capacity has been undergoing constant reduction every year.

In 2021, Indian Point Energy Center, the last remaining nuclear power plant in the New York City metropolitan area, was shut down. Environmental groups celebrated the decision to close the plant, while critics pointed to the sites generation being replaced by two gas fired power plants resulting in an increase of fossil fuel consumption.

South Korea 
In 2017, responding to widespread public concerns after the Fukushima Daiichi nuclear disaster in Japan, the high earthquake risk in South Korea, and a 2013 nuclear scandal involving the use of counterfeit parts, the new government of President Moon Jae-in had decided to gradually phase out nuclear power in South Korea. Such decision, however, was met with widespread criticism regarding its political transparency and various doubts regarding its process. This was especially highlighted when the construction of Shin Gori unit 5 and 6 were unilaterally stopped by the government. Being faced with stark criticism, the construction of Shin Gori unit 5 and 6 were eventually restarted.

Later into the administrative period, Moon Jae-in government and its nuclear phase-out policy is facing heavier criticism than before, from both the opposing parties as well as general public due to lack of realistic alternative, consequential increase in electricity price, negative effects on the related industries, public consensus of needs to reduce carbon footprint and the decrease of popularity due to other political and economical failures. Surveys from 2021 shows that the support for nuclear phase out has drastically reduced, although the details differ from majority support to majority disapproval depending on the survey. President Moon reversed his government's nuclear phaseout policy just before the election in February 2022.

In the 2022 election candidate Yoon Seok-Yeol promised to cancel the phase out if elected and continue running all plants as long as they safely could be develop new technology and become a global export powerhouse. Yoon went on to win a very close election in what was seen as a big win for the nuclear sector.

Pros and cons of nuclear power

The nuclear debate

The nuclear power debate is about the controversy which has surrounded the deployment and use of nuclear fission reactors to generate electricity from nuclear fuel for civilian purposes.  The debate about nuclear power peaked during the 1970s and 1980s, when it "reached an intensity unprecedented in the history of technology controversies", in some countries.

Proponents of nuclear energy argue that nuclear power is a sustainable energy source which reduces carbon emissions and can increase energy security if its use supplants a dependence on imported fuels. Proponents cite scientific studies affirming the consensus that nuclear power produces virtually no air pollution, in contrast to the chief dispatchable alternative of fossil fuel. Proponents also believe that nuclear power is the only viable course to achieve energy independence for most Western countries. They emphasise that the risks of storing spent fuel are small and can be further reduced by using the latest technology in newer reactors, fuel recycling, and long-lived radioisotope burn-up. For instance, spent nuclear fuel in the United States could extend nuclear power generation by hundreds of years because more than 90% of spent fuel can be reprocessed. The operational safety record in the Western world is excellent when compared to the other major kinds of power plants.

Over 10,000 hospitals worldwide use radioisotopes in medicine, and about 90% of the procedures are for diagnosis. The radioisotope most commonly used in diagnosis is technetium-99. Some 40 million procedures per year, accounting for about 80% of all nuclear medicine procedures and 85% of diagnostic scans in nuclear medicine worldwide. The main radioisotopes such as Tc-99m cannot effectively be produced without reactors. Most smoke detectors use americium-241, meaning every American home uses these common radioisotopes to ensure the safety of their loved ones.

Opponents say that nuclear power poses many threats to people and the environment. These threats include health risks and environmental damage from uranium mining, processing and transport, the risk of nuclear weapons proliferation or sabotage, and the problem of radioactive nuclear waste. They also contend that reactors themselves are enormously complex machines where many things can and do go wrong, and there have been many serious nuclear accidents. Critics do not believe that these risks can be reduced through new technology. They argue that when all the energy-intensive stages of the nuclear fuel chain are considered, from uranium mining to nuclear decommissioning, nuclear power is not a low-carbon electricity source. These pieces of criticism have however largely been quelled by the IPCC which indicated in 2014 that nuclear energy was a low carbon energy production technology, comparable to wind and lower than solar in that regard.

Economics
 
The economics of new nuclear power plants is a controversial subject, since there are diverging views on this topic, and multi-billion dollar investments ride on the choice of an energy source. Nuclear power plants typically have high capital costs for building the plant, but low direct fuel costs (with much of the costs of fuel extraction, processing, use and long term storage externalised).  Therefore, comparison with other power generation methods is strongly dependent on assumptions about construction timescales and capital financing for nuclear plants. Cost estimates also need to take into account plant decommissioning and nuclear waste storage costs. On the other hand measures to mitigate global warming, such as a carbon tax or carbon emissions trading, may favour the economics of nuclear power versus fossil fuels.
 
In recent years there has been a slowdown of electricity demand growth and financing has become more difficult, which affects large projects such as nuclear reactors, with very large upfront costs and long project cycles which carry a large variety of risks. In Eastern Europe, a number of long-established projects are struggling to find finance, notably Belene in Bulgaria and the additional reactors at Cernavoda in Romania, and some potential backers have pulled out. Where cheap natural gas is available and its future supply relatively secure, this also poses a major problem for nuclear projects.

Analysis of the economics of nuclear power must take into account who bears the risks of future uncertainties. To date all operating nuclear power plants were developed by state-owned or regulated utility monopolies where many of the risks associated with construction costs, operating performance, fuel price, and other factors were borne by consumers rather than suppliers. Many countries have now liberalised the electricity market where these risks, and the risk of cheaper competitors emerging before capital costs are recovered, are borne by plant suppliers and operators rather than consumers, which leads to a significantly different evaluation of the economics of new nuclear power plants.
 
Following the 2011 Fukushima Daiichi nuclear disaster, costs are likely to go up for currently operating and new nuclear power plants, due to increased requirements for on-site spent fuel management and elevated design basis threats.

Environment
 

 
The environmental impact of nuclear power results from the nuclear fuel cycle, operation, and the effects of nuclear accidents.

The greenhouse gas emissions from nuclear fission power are small relative to those associated with coal, oil, gas, and biomass. They are about equal to those associated with wind and hydroelectric.

The routine health risks from nuclear fission power are very small relative to those associated with coal, oil, gas, solar, biomass, wind and hydroelectric.

However, there is a "catastrophic risk" potential if containment fails, which in nuclear reactors can be brought about by over-heated fuels melting and releasing large quantities of fission products into the environment. The public is sensitive to these risks and there has been considerable public opposition to nuclear power. Even so, in comparing the fatalities for major accidents alone in the energy sector it is still found that the risks associated with nuclear power are extremely small relative to those associated with coal, oil, gas and hydroelectric. For the operation of a 1000-MWe nuclear power plant the complete nuclear fuel cycle, from mining to reactor operation to waste disposal, the radiation dose is cited as 136 person-rem/year, the dose is 490 person-rem/year for an equivalent coal-fired power plant.

The 1979 Three Mile Island accident and 1986 Chernobyl disaster, along with high construction costs, ended the rapid growth of global nuclear power capacity. A further disastrous release of radioactive materials followed the 2011 Japanese tsunami which damaged the Fukushima I Nuclear Power Plant, resulting in hydrogen gas explosions and partial meltdowns classified as a Level 7 event. The large-scale release of radioactivity resulted in people being evacuated from a 20 km exclusion zone set up around the power plant, similar to the 30 km radius Chernobyl Exclusion Zone still in effect. Subsequent scientific assessment of the health impacts of radiation has shown that these evacuations were more damaging than the radiation could have been, and recommend that the population be advised to remain in place in all but the most severe radiological release events.

Accidents
 

The effect of nuclear accidents has been a topic of debate practically since the first nuclear reactors were constructed. It has also been a key factor in public concern about nuclear facilities. Some technical measures to reduce the risk of accidents or to minimise the amount of radioactivity released to the environment have been adopted. Despite the use of such measures, human error remains, and "there have been many accidents with varying effects as well near misses and incidents".
 
Benjamin K. Sovacool has reported that worldwide there have been 99 accidents at nuclear power plants. Fifty-seven accidents have occurred since the Chernobyl disaster, and 57% (56 out of 99) of all nuclear-related accidents have occurred in the USA. Serious nuclear power plant accidents include the Fukushima Daiichi nuclear disaster (2011), Chernobyl disaster (1986), Three Mile Island accident (1979), and the SL-1 accident (1961). Stuart Arm states, "apart from Chernobyl, no nuclear workers or members of the public have ever died as a result of exposure to radiation due to a commercial nuclear reactor incident."
 
The International Atomic Energy Agency maintains a website reporting recent accidents.

Safety
 
Nuclear safety and security covers the actions taken to prevent nuclear and radiation accidents or to limit their consequences.  This covers nuclear power plants as well as all other nuclear facilities, the transportation of nuclear materials, and the use and storage of nuclear materials for medical, power, industry, and military uses.

Although there is no way to guarantee that a reactor will always be designed, built and operated safely, the nuclear power industry has improved the safety and performance of reactors, and has proposed safer reactor designs, though many of these designs have yet to be tested at industrial or commercial scales. Mistakes do occur and the designers of reactors at Fukushima in Japan did not anticipate that a tsunami generated by an earthquake would disable the backup systems that were supposed to stabilise the reactor after the earthquake. According to UBS AG, the Fukushima I nuclear accidents have cast doubt on whether even an advanced economy like Japan can master nuclear safety. Catastrophic scenarios involving terrorist attacks are also conceivable.

An interdisciplinary team from MIT have estimated that given the expected growth of nuclear power from 2005 to 2055, at least four serious nuclear accidents would be expected in that period. To date, there have been five serious accidents (core damage) in the world since 1970 (one at Three Mile Island in 1979; one at Chernobyl in 1986; and three at Fukushima-Daiichi in 2011), corresponding to the beginning of the operation of generation II reactors. This leads to on average one serious accident happening every eight years worldwide. Despite these accidents and public opinion, the safety record of nuclear power, in terms of lives lost (ignoring nonfatal illnesses) per unit of electricity delivered, is better than every other major source of power in the world, and on par with solar and wind.

Energy transition

Energy transition is the shift by several countries to sustainable economies by means of renewable energy, energy efficiency and sustainable development. This trend has been augmented by diversifying electricity generation and allowing homes and businesses with solar panels on their rooftops to sell electricity to the grid. In the future this could "lead to a majority of our energy coming from decentralized solar panels and wind turbines scattered across the country" rather than large power plants. The final goal of German proponents of a nuclear power phase-out is the abolishment of coal and other non-renewable energy sources.

Issues exist that currently prevent a shift over to 100% renewable technologies. There is debate over the environmental impact of solar power, and the environmental impact of wind power. Some argue that the pollution produced and requirement of rare-earth elements offsets many of the benefits compared to other alternative power sources such as hydroelectric, geothermal, and nuclear power.

See also 

 Nuclear renaissance
 Anti-nuclear movement
 Energy conservation
 Energy development
 Fossil fuel phase-out
 List of energy topics
 Nuclear Non-Proliferation Treaty
 Nuclear energy policy
 Nuclear power controversy
 Nuclear power in France
 Renewable energy commercialisation
 Wind power

Notes and references

Further reading

Angwin, Meredith (2020).  Shorting the Grid, The Hidden Fragility of Our Electric Grid, Carnot Communications.
Conley, Mike and Maloney, Tim (2017). ROADMAP TO NOWHERE The Myth of Powering the Nation With Renewable Energy.
Cooke, Stephanie (2009). In Mortal Hands: A Cautionary History of the Nuclear Age, Black Inc.
Cragin, Susan (2007). Nuclear Nebraska: The Remarkable Story of the Little County That Couldn’t Be Bought, AMACOM.
Diesendorf, Mark (2007).  Greenhouse Solutions with Sustainable Energy, University of New South Wales Press.
Elliott, David (2007).  Nuclear or Not? Does Nuclear Power Have a Place in a Sustainable Energy Future?, Palgrave.
Falk, Jim (1982). Global Fission: The Battle Over Nuclear Power, Oxford University Press.
Lovins, Amory B. (1977). Soft Energy Paths: Towards a Durable Peace, Friends of the Earth International, 
Lovins, Amory B. and John H. Price (1975). Non-Nuclear Futures: The Case for an Ethical Energy Strategy, Ballinger Publishing Company, 1975, 
Pernick, Ron and Clint Wilder (2007). The Clean Tech Revolution: The Next Big Growth and Investment Opportunity, Collins, 
Price, Jerome (1982). The Antinuclear Movement, Twayne Publishers.
Rudig, Wolfgang (1990). Anti-nuclear Movements: A World Survey of Opposition to Nuclear Energy, Longman.
Schneider, Mycle, Steve Thomas, Antony Froggatt, Doug Koplow (August 2009). The World Nuclear Industry Status Report, German Federal Ministry of Environment, Nature Conservation and Reactor Safety.
Sovacool, Benjamin K. (2011). Contesting the Future of Nuclear Power: A Critical Global Assessment of Atomic Energy, World Scientific.
Walker, J. Samuel (2004). Three Mile Island: A Nuclear Crisis in Historical Perspective, University of California Press.
William D. Nordhaus, The Swedish Nuclear Dilemma – Energy and the Environment. 1997. Hardcover, .
Bernard Leonard Cohen, The Nuclear Energy Option: An Alternative for the 90's. 1990. Hardcover. . Bernard Cohen's homepage contains the full text of the book.

External links 
 German Energy Transition
Fairewinds Energy Education

Environmentalism
Nuclear technology
Nuclear history
Technological phase-outs

sv:Kärnkraft#Kärnkraftsfrågan